Harlem High School may refer to:

 Harlem High School (Georgia)
 Harlem High School (Illinois)